Luis Morán Sánchez (born 26 July 1987) is a Spanish professional footballer who plays mainly as a right winger.

Club career
Born in Luanco, Asturias, and a product of local Sporting de Gijón's youth academy, Morán appeared once for its first team in 2006–07, with the club in the Segunda División. In his first two full professional seasons, he scored four goals in 28 matches apiece.

In 2008–09, with Sporting now in La Liga, Morán netted an historical goal in the last round against Recreativo de Huelva (2–1 home win), which guaranteed top-flight status for a further year. He repeated the same exact numbers the following campaign, being utilised mostly as a right winger by manager Manuel Preciado as opposed to his attacking midfielder role in the reserves.

Morán only made 15 league appearances in 2010–11 – six starts, 608 minutes, no goals – as the side once again remained in the top division. On 31 August 2012, after a short loan spell with AEK Larnaca FC in Cyprus, Sporting announced he was leaving the club.

On 31 January 2013, after spending several months without a team, Morán signed for second-tier CD Mirandés until the end of the season. Safe for a very brief spell in his country with UD Logroñés, he then plied his trade in the Cypriot first and second divisions as well as the Football League Greece.

Morán returned to his hometown in August 2017, with the 30-year-old joining Marino de Luanco on a one-year deal. On 5 July 2019, after having been an essential unit as the team promoted from Tercera División as runners-up under former Spanish international Oli, he renewed his contract.

Club statistics

References

External links

1987 births
Living people
People from Gozón
Spanish footballers
Footballers from Asturias
Association football wingers
La Liga players
Segunda División players
Segunda División B players
Tercera División players
Segunda Federación players
Sporting de Gijón B players
Sporting de Gijón players
CD Mirandés footballers
UD Logroñés players
Marino de Luanco footballers
Cypriot First Division players
Cypriot Second Division players
AEK Larnaca FC players
Ermis Aradippou FC players
Othellos Athienou F.C. players
Football League (Greece) players
Olympiacos Volos F.C. players
Spain youth international footballers
Spanish expatriate footballers
Expatriate footballers in Cyprus
Expatriate footballers in Greece
Spanish expatriate sportspeople in Cyprus
Spanish expatriate sportspeople in Greece